"Rain Dance" is a song written by Burton Cummings and Kurt Winter and performed by The Guess Who.  It was featured on their 1971 album, So Long, Bannatyne.  The song was produced by Jack Richardson.

Chart performance
"Rain Dance" reached #3 in Canada, #8 in New Zealand,
 #19 on the Billboard Hot 100, and #55 in Australia in 1971.

References

1971 songs
1971 singles
Songs written by Burton Cummings
Songs written by Kurt Winter
The Guess Who songs
Song recordings produced by Jack Richardson (record producer)
RCA Victor singles